Alexandros Tereziou (born 1 March 2000) is a Greek professional footballer who plays as a centre-forward for Super League 2 club Panathinaikos B.

Career

Skënderbeu Korçë
On 22 October 2020, Tereziou signed a four-year contract with Kategoria Superiore club Skënderbeu Korçë and received squad number 11.

References

2000 births
Living people
Footballers from Nafplion
Greek people of Albanian descent
Association football forwards
Greek footballers
Greek expatriate footballers
Albanian footballers
Albanian expatriate footballers
Super League Greece players
Super League Greece 2 players
Kategoria Superiore players
Asteras Tripolis F.C. players
A.E. Karaiskakis F.C. players
KF Skënderbeu Korçë players
Volos N.F.C. players
Panathinaikos F.C. B players
Albanian expatriate sportspeople in Greece
Expatriate footballers in Greece
Greek expatriate sportspeople in Albania
Expatriate footballers in Albania